John 'Jackie' Rafferty (born 3 May 1966) was a Scottish footballer who played for Dumbarton and Partick Thistle.

References

1966 births
Scottish footballers
Dumbarton F.C. players
Partick Thistle F.C. players
Scottish Football League players
Living people
Association football defenders